Robert Sidney Kennemore (June 21, 1920 – April 26, 1989), of Greenville, South Carolina, earned the Medal of Honor during the bitter Chosin Reservoir campaign of November 1950, when he deliberately covered an enemy grenade with his foot to keep his men from being wounded or killed. Staff Sergeant Kennemore, who lost both of his legs through his unselfish sacrifice, was the 23rd Marine to receive his nation's highest award for heroism in Korea. The medal was presented to him by President Harry S. Truman during ceremonies at the White House on November 24, 1952.

Biography
Kennemore was born on June 21, 1920, in Greenville, South Carolina. He attended high school in Simpsonville, South Carolina, until 1935, and was employed by the Montgomery Ward Company, in Chicago, Illinois, before enlisting in the United States Marine Corps on June 20, 1940.

Completing his recruit training in Marine Corps Recruit Depot San Diego, California, in August 1940, he was stationed there until July 1942, when he sailed for the Pacific theater with the 1st Marine Division. After serving with the division in the Guadalcanal-Tulagi campaign, he returned to the United States in June 1943 for duty at Camp Lejeune, North Carolina.

In February 1944, he was ordered to Camp Pendleton, California, where he served until that September. He was then stationed at the Marine Barracks, Klamath Falls, Oregon, until February 1945, when he was assigned to the Marine Barracks, at the Naval Air Station, Boca Chica, Florida.

In July 1945, after brief service at Camp Lejeune, he embarked for Japan to serve on occupation duty with the 2nd Marine Division. He returned to the States in April 1946, and served briefly at San Diego and the Marine Barracks, New Orleans, Louisiana, until September 1946, when he began a year of duty at the Marine Barracks, Naval Mine Depot, Yorktown, Virginia. In September 1947, he was ordered to New York City, where he served for two years at Headquarters of the 3rd Marine Corps Reserve District.

Staff Sergeant Kennemore joined the 2nd Battalion, 6th Marine Regiment, 2nd Marine Division, at Camp Lejeune, in October 1949, and with the outbreak of the Korean fighting, moved with the battalion to the west coast in July 1950. The 2nd Battalion was made part of the 7th Marines, 1st Marine Division in August 1950, and the following month, Kennemore embarked for Korea, where he served with the 2nd Battalion in the Seoul and Chosin Reservoir campaigns.

It was at the Chosin Reservoir that he lost both of his legs.  Kennemore was fighting in a slit trench alongside two other Marines when a grenade landed beside him.  Without regard to his safety he grabbed it threw it back.  Immediately after, another grenade landed in the trench, and he used his foot to push it into the earth.  At this point he noticed yet another grenade lying close by.  Without hesitation he kneeled down on the third grenade and effectively absorbed the blast of the two grenades through his legs.  Due to his actions, Kennemore saved the lives of two fellow Marines.  Kennemore returned to the United States in December 1950 for treatment at the U.S. Naval Hospital, Oakland, California. He remained there for almost a year, until his retirement on October 31, 1951.

Kennemore was a participant at the 1956 Republican National Convention as the leader of the Pledge of Allegiance on the first day.

Staff Sergeant Kennemore died on April 26, 1989. He was buried in the San Francisco National Cemetery, San Francisco, California.

Decorations

In addition to the Medal of Honor and the Purple Heart he received for his wounds, SSgt Kennemore's medals and decorations include the Presidential Unit Citation with two bronze stars; the Marine Corps Good Conduct Medal with two bronze stars in lieu of second and third awards; the American Defense Service Medal; the American Theater Campaign Medal; the Asiatic-Pacific Theater Campaign Medal with two bronze stars; the World War II Victory Medal; the Navy Occupation Service Medal with Asia Clasp; the Korean Service Medal with two bronze stars; and the United Nations Service Medal.

Medal of Honor citation
The President of the United States in the name of The Congress pleasure in presenting the MEDAL OF HONOR to

for service as set forth in the following CITATION:
For conspicuous gallantry and intrepidity at the risk of his life above and beyond the call of duty as Leader of a Machine-Gun Section in Company E, Second Battalion, Seventh Marines, First Marine Division (Reinforced), in action against enemy aggressor forces in Korea on 27 and November 28, 1950. With the company's defensive perimeter overrun by a numerically superior hostile force during a savage night attack north of Yudam-ni and his platoon commander seriously wounded, Staff Sergeant Kennemore unhesitatingly assumed command, quickly reorganized the unit and directed the men in consolidating the position. When an enemy grenade landed in the midst of a machine-gun squad, he bravely placed his foot on the missile and, in the face of almost certain death, personally absorbed the full force of the explosion to prevent injury to his fellow Marines. By his indomitable courage, outstanding leadership and selfless efforts in behalf of his comrades, Staff Sergeant Kennemore was greatly instrumental in driving the enemy from the area and upheld the highest traditions of the United States Naval Service.
/S/ HARRY S. TRUMAN

Namesakes
The Marine Corps League Detachment #1105 in Greenville, South Carolina, the Owens/Kennemore Detachment, is named for the two Greenville Medal of Honor recipients — Robert Kennemore and World War II recipient Robert A. Owens.

See also

List of Medal of Honor recipients
List of Korean War Medal of Honor recipients

References
Inline

General

Further reading
Russ, Martin. Breakout: The Chosin Reservoir Campaign, Korea 1950, Fromm International, 1999.

External links

1920 births
1989 deaths
American amputees
United States Marines
United States Marine Corps personnel of World War II
United States Marine Corps personnel of the Korean War
Military personnel from South Carolina
People from Greenville, South Carolina
United States Marine Corps Medal of Honor recipients
Korean War recipients of the Medal of Honor
Burials at San Francisco National Cemetery